Gurizeneh (also Romanized as Gūrīzeneh) is a village in Alaviyeh Rural District, Kordian District, Jahrom County, Fars Province, Iran. At the 2006 census, its population was 19, in 4 families.

References 

Populated places in Jahrom County